Brudzeń Duży  is a village in Płock County, Masovian Voivodeship, in east-central Poland. It is the seat of the gmina (administrative district) called Gmina Brudzeń Duży.

As of 2011, the village has a population of 1053. The village is the birthplace of scholar Pawel Wlodkowic (ca. 1370–1435).

See also
Brudzeń Landscape Park

References

Villages in Płock County